The CXAM radar system was the first production radar system deployed on United States Navy ships, operating in the mid-high VHF frequency band of 200 MHz. It followed several earlier prototype systems, such as the NRL radar installed in April 1937 on the destroyer ; its successor, the XAF, installed in December 1938 on the battleship ; and the first RCA-designed system, the CXZ, installed in December 1938 or January 1939 on the battleship . Based on testing in January 1939, where the XAF was more reliable, the US Navy ordered RCA to build six XAF-based units for deployment and then shortly thereafter ordered 14 more.

The first six units RCA produced (delivered in 1940) were denoted "CXAM" and were a fusion of XAF and CXZ technologies. The next 14 units RCA produced (also delivered in 1940) were denoted "CXAM-1" and were slight improvements over the CXAM design.

Radar detection range of aircraft depends on altitude, size, and number of the target aircraft, as well as the radar's characteristics, such as transmitter power and receiver sensitivity. Surface ships are more difficult to detect due to a number of factors such as signal return from waves (called in general ground clutter), distance to the horizon (due to the curvature of the earth), elevation of the radar antenna, height of the target above the sea surface, and water vapor in the air. These factors serve to reduce the range at which a surface target can be detected when compared to aircraft. Lexington's CXAM-1 detected the incoming Japanese carrier aircraft strike at a range of  during the battle of the Coral Sea.

The US Army's first non-prototype radar system, the SCR-270, was developed in parallel with the CXAM.

Notes

References 
U.S. Radar, Operational Characteristics of Radar Classified by Tactical Application, FTP 217
History of US radar development.
History of US radar development, with more detail on CXAM.
Initial installations of CXAM.
Date of Yorktown installation.
Date of Yorktown testing with CXAM.

Naval radars
World War II American electronics
World War II radars
Military radars of the United States
Military equipment introduced from 1940 to 1944